Dale DeVon (born July 25, 1958) is an American politician who is the Republican member of the Indiana House of Representatives representing District 5.  He was first elected in 2012.

DeVon and his wife Christine are the parents of three children.  He is also the National Director of the Home Builders Association.

References

Living people
1958 births
Republican Party members of the Indiana House of Representatives
21st-century American politicians